Reuteroscopus is a genus of plant bugs in the family Miridae. There are more than 50 described species in Reuteroscopus.

Species
These 56 species belong to the genus Reuteroscopus:

 Reuteroscopus abroniae Knight, 1965
 Reuteroscopus antennatus Kelton, 1964
 Reuteroscopus aztecus Kelton, 1964
 Reuteroscopus basicornis Knight, 1965
 Reuteroscopus brevicornis Knight, 1965
 Reuteroscopus brevirostris Knight, 1965
 Reuteroscopus brevis Knight, 1965
 Reuteroscopus burkei Knight, 1965
 Reuteroscopus cacerensis Carvalho, 1985
 Reuteroscopus carmelitanus Carvalho, 1984
 Reuteroscopus carolinae Knight, 1965
 Reuteroscopus carvalhoi Maldonado & Poinar, 1995
 Reuteroscopus chillcotti Kelton, 1964
 Reuteroscopus cisandinus Carvalho, 1984
 Reuteroscopus complexus Kelton, 1964
 Reuteroscopus croceus Knight, 1965
 Reuteroscopus cuernavacae Knight, 1965
 Reuteroscopus curacaoensis Kelton, 1964
 Reuteroscopus diffusus Kelton, 1964
 Reuteroscopus digitatus Kelton, 1964
 Reuteroscopus dreisbachi Knight, 1965
 Reuteroscopus ecuadorensis Carvalho, 1984
 Reuteroscopus falcatus Van Duzee, 1917
 Reuteroscopus femoralis Kelton, 1964
 Reuteroscopus froeschneri Knight, 1953
 Reuteroscopus fuscatus Knight, 1965
 Reuteroscopus goianus Carvalho, 1984
 Reuteroscopus gracilifornis Knight, 1965
 Reuteroscopus grandis Knight, 1965
 Reuteroscopus guaranianus Carvalho, 1984
 Reuteroscopus hamatus Kelton, 1964
 Reuteroscopus immaculatus Knight, 1965
 Reuteroscopus leonensis Carvalho & Costa, 1992
 Reuteroscopus longirostris Knight, 1925
 Reuteroscopus luteus Knight, 1965
 Reuteroscopus matogrossensis Carvalho, 1984
 Reuteroscopus medius Knight, 1965
 Reuteroscopus mexicanus Kelton, 1964
 Reuteroscopus michoacanus Carvalho & Costa, 1992
 Reuteroscopus nicholi (Knight, 1930)
 Reuteroscopus nigricornis Knight, 1965
 Reuteroscopus oaxacae Knight, 1965
 Reuteroscopus obscurus Knight, 1965
 Reuteroscopus ornatus (Reuter, 1876) (ornate plant bug)
 Reuteroscopus pallidiclavus Knight, 1965
 Reuteroscopus paraensis Carvalho, 1984
 Reuteroscopus peruanus Carvalho & Melendez, 1986
 Reuteroscopus santaritae Knight, 1965
 Reuteroscopus schaffneri Knight, 1965
 Reuteroscopus similis Kelton, 1964
 Reuteroscopus sonorensis Carvalho, 1990
 Reuteroscopus tinctipennis (Knight, 1925)
 Reuteroscopus uvidus (Distant, 1893)
 Reuteroscopus venezeulanus Barros de Carvalho
 Reuteroscopus venezuelanus Carvalho, 1984
 Reuteroscopus villaverdeae Carvalho, 1990

References

Further reading

External links

 

Phylini
Articles created by Qbugbot